The 1924–25 season was Newport County's fifth season in the Football League, fourth consecutive season in the Third Division South and fifth season overall in the third tier. The club eventually finished sixth, but in the second half of the season County were in contention for the one available promotion place to the Second Division. The matches with local rivals Swansea Town on 10 and 13 April were crucial to either side's chances of promotion. Going into the home game on 10 April, Newport were in fifth place and Swansea were top. A season's best attendance saw County knock Town from top spot with a 3–0 win, but they regained it with a win in the return fixture three days later. Swansea went on to win the title by one point.

Season review

Results summary

Results by round

Fixtures and results

Third Division South

FA Cup

Welsh Cup

League table

P = Matches played; W = Matches won; D = Matches drawn; L = Matches lost; F = Goals for; A = Goals against; GA = Goal average; Pts = Points

External links
 Newport County 1924-1925 : Results
 Newport County football club match record: 1925
 Welsh Cup 1924/25

1924-25
English football clubs 1924–25 season
1924–25 in Welsh football